Kompaniivka Raion was a raion (district) of Kirovohrad Oblast in central Ukraine. The raion's administrative center was located in the urban-type settlement of Kompaniivka. The raion was abolished on 18 July 2020 as part of the administrative reform of Ukraine, which reduced the number of raions of Kirovohrad Oblast to four. The area of Kompaniivka Raion was merged into Kropyvnytskyi Raion.

At the time of disestablishment, the raion consisted of one hromada, Kompaniivka settlement hromada with the administration in Kompaniivka.

References

Former raions of Kirovohrad Oblast
1965 establishments in Ukraine
Ukrainian raions abolished during the 2020 administrative reform